Pablo David Palacios Herreria (born February 5, 1982 in Quito) is a former Ecuadorian football striker. He is known as one of the best strikers in the domestic tournament and has solidified his reputation as a goalscorer amongst Ecuador's top clubs.

Club career
Palacios started out as a LDU Quito youth product, but got very little playing time. After spending some seasons in third division clubs América de Quito and Otavalo, he moved to Liga's rivals Aucas in 2004. By 2006, he had scored 23 goals in 81 matches, earning him a transfer to one of Ecuador's big teams, Deportivo Quito. His talent and goalscoring prowess earned him a call-up to the national team from Colombian coach Luis Fernando Suárez.

Barcelona Sporting Club
In December 2007, Palacios moved to Ecuador's most popular team, Guayaquil side Barcelona. In his first season at the club, he netted 20 goals, finishing the season as the league's top scorer. However, 2009 proved to be a regrettable season for both himself and the club. Barcelona barely escaped relegation and Palacios was tied as Barca's top-scorer for the season with only 6 goals. Despite of the uncertainty if Palacios would remain in Barcelona for the 2010 season, on January 4, 2010 he signed a one-year contract with the club he has confessed of being a fan of, Barcelona.

Emelec
In January 2012 Palacios was signed on a free by Barcelona's archrival Emelec.

International career
Palacios began playing for Ecuador in 2007, making some important appearances against squads like Sweden, Ireland, and Colombia.

He was part of the squad that participated in the 2007 Copa América. However, he was not featured in any matches and watched Ecuador's early elimination on the bench. He did not get another callup until August 2008 when national team manager Sixto Vizuete called him up for a friendly against Colombia. He was called again to play with Bolivia and Uruguay in September 2008 for the 2010 FIFA World Cup Qualification matches. He came off the bench against Bolivia making his official debut in this tournament. On June 10, 2009, Palacios scored the second goal in a 2-0 win over Argentina.

International goals

References

External links
 Palacio's FEF player card 
 
 
 

1982 births
Living people
Footballers from Quito
Ecuadorian people of Spanish descent
Association football forwards
Ecuadorian footballers
Spanish footballers
Ecuador international footballers
S.D. Aucas footballers
S.D. Quito footballers
Barcelona S.C. footballers
C.S. Emelec footballers
C.D. El Nacional footballers
Ecuadorian Serie A players